Wetherbee House may refer to:

Wetherbee House (Greenville, Mississippi), listed on the NRHP in Mississippi
Levi Wetherbee Farm, Boxborough, Massachusetts, listed on the NRHP in Massachusetts
Wetherbee House (Waltham, Massachusetts), listed on the NRHP in Massachusetts